The Confederate State Capitol building in Washington, Arkansas was the capital of the Confederate state government of Arkansas, during 1863–1865, after Little Rock, Arkansas fell to Union forces in the American Civil War.  It is located within Historic Washington State Park, and is a National Historic Landmark.

Description and history
It is topped by a hip roof covered in cedar shakes. Each of the two floors is dominated by a large chamber; that on the ground floor originally served as a courtroom, while that on the upper floor was used by local Masonic societies. The original front entrance is sheltered by a single-story portico with a triangular pediment with Greek Revival styling. There are chimneys on the two sides of the building.

The building was erected in 1836, and was Hempstead County's second courthouse, replacing an 1824 log structure.  The building served as the county court until 1874, when a new brick building was constructed.  After the fall of Little Rock to Union Army forces in September 1863, during the American Civil War, Governor Harris Flanagin ordered the seat of government relocated to Washington.  The Confederate state government would remain in this building until the end of the war in 1865.

After the court functions moved out in 1874, the building was repurposed for use as a school, a role it fulfilled until 1914.  It thereafter served as a private residence until 1928, when it was acquired by the state through the efforts of the local United Daughters of the Confederacy chapter.  It is now part of Historic Washington State Park.

The building was listed on the National Register of Historic Places in 1970, and, with other sites, was designated part of the Camden Expedition Sites National Historic Landmark District in 1994.

See also
List of National Historic Landmarks in Arkansas
National Register of Historic Places listings in Hempstead County, Arkansas

References

Camden Expedition Sites National Historic Landmark
Government buildings completed in 1836
Government buildings on the National Register of Historic Places in Arkansas
Individually listed contributing properties to historic districts on the National Register in Arkansas
Museums in Hempstead County, Arkansas
National Register of Historic Places in Hempstead County, Arkansas
1836 establishments in Arkansas
Greek Revival architecture in Arkansas
Courthouses on the National Register of Historic Places in Arkansas
County courthouses in Arkansas
American Civil War on the National Register of Historic Places
Arkansas in the American Civil War
United Daughters of the Confederacy monuments and memorials in Arkansas
Arkansas